Edir Pedro de Oliveira (3 February 1950 – 4 August 2022) was a Brazilian politician. A member of the Brazilian Labour Party, he served as the mayor of Gravataí from 1993 to 1997.

Oliveira died of cardiac arrest in Gravataí on 4 August 2022, at the age of 72.

References

1950 births
2022 deaths
Brazilian Labour Party (current) politicians
Members of the Chamber of Deputies (Brazil) from Rio Grande do Sul
People from Rolante